Mampong is one of the constituencies represented in the Parliament of Ghana. Mampong is located in Ashanti Region.

Members of parliament 
Kwaku Ampratwum-Sarpong has been the member of parliament for the constituency since 2016. He was elected on the ticket of the New Patriotic Party (NPP) won a majority of 20,472 votes to become the MP. He succeeded Francis Addai Nimoh who had represented the constituency in the 4th Republic parliament.

See also
List of Ghana Parliament constituencies

References 

Parliamentary constituencies in the Ashanti Region